Dorit Kreysler (1909–1999) was an Austrian film actress.

Filmography

 Enjoy Yourselves (1934)
 Mr. Kobin Seeks Adventure (1934)
 Jungfrau gegen Mönch (1934)
 Fresh Wind from Canada (1935)
 A Night on the Danube (1935)
 Peter spielt mit dem Feuer (1938)
 Die kluge Schwiegermutter (1939)
 Woman Without a Past (1939)
 Roses in Tyrol (1940)
 Woman Made to Measure  (1940)
 My Daughter Lives in Vienna (1940)
 Commissioner Eyck (1940)
 Herz ohne Heimat (1940)
 Liebesschule (1940)
 Vienna Blood (1942)
 Karneval der Liebe (1943)
 Die Wirtin zum Weißen Röß'l (1943)
 Beloved Darling (1943)
 The Master Detective (1944)
 Die Fledermaus (1946)
 Artists' Blood (1949)
 Nothing But Coincidence (1949)
 Ich mach dich glücklich (1949)
 Twelve Hearts for Charly (1949)
 Wedding with Erika (1950)
 Czardas der Herzen (1951)
 Sensation in San Remo (1951)
 I Lost My Heart in Heidelberg (1952)
 The Chaste Libertine (1952)
 The Postponed Wedding Night (1953)
 Aunt Jutta from Calcutta (1953)
 Cabaret (1954)
 The Inn on the Lahn (1955)
 In Hamburg When the Nights Are Long (1956)
 Opera Ball (1956)
 Love, Summer and Music (1956)
 Zwei Herzen voller Seligkeit (1957)
 The Simple Girl (1957)

References

Bibliography
 Goble, Alan. The Complete Index to Literary Sources in Film. Walter de Gruyter, 1999.

External links

1909 births
1999 deaths
Austrian film actresses
20th-century Austrian actresses